Darling Don't Cheat is a 2016 Indian Hindi-language thriller drama film directed by Rajkumar Hindusthani and produced by Hindusthani through Fyeo Media Works. The film will be releasing on 11 March 2016.  To promote the film, the studio organized a contest which would result in the winner receiving a trip to a nudist beach. There were over 100,000 contestants, with an estimated 30% comprising women. The film centers on an aspiring actress who becomes entwined with a kidnapper who forces women to strip for him.

Cast 
 Gaurav Pandey as Vikrant
 Ashish Tyagi as Randeep
 Neha Chaterji
 Raiya Sinha
 Shivank Choudhary
 Suneha Chaudhary
 Sanntosh Kumar

References

External links 
 
 

2016 films
2010s Hindi-language films